German submarine U-120 was a Type IIB U-boat of Nazi Germany's Kriegsmarine during World War II. She was laid down on 31 March 1938 at the Flender Werke, Lübeck as yard number 268. She was launched on 16 March 1940 and commissioned on 20 April under Oberleutnant zur See (Oblt.z.S.) Ernst Bauer.

Emblem
U-120s emblem was an oak leaf, with an anchor, and a knife or dagger.

Built for China
The Chinese Nationalist government used 10,000,000 Marks to order two Type IIB U-boats in 1937. They also dispatched 80 men to Germany for training in submarine operations. The Japanese government complained about this transaction, so the Chinese took their money back and these two vessels joined the Kriegsmarine after the outbreak of the Second World War in Europe. They were U-120 and U-121.

Design
German Type IIB submarines were enlarged versions of the original Type IIs. U-120 had a displacement of  when at the surface and  while submerged. She had two shafts and two  propellers.

U-120 was fitted with three  torpedo tubes at the bow, five torpedoes or up to twelve Type A torpedo mines, and a  anti-aircraft gun. The boat had a complement of twenty five.

Service history
U-120 was active from 1940 until she was scuttled in 1945. She was one of two Type II U-boats built at the Flender Werke in Lübeck. Along with her sister boat , she was originally built for export to China. The advent of World War II and increased training needs, led the German high command to assign U-120 and U-121 to the training command. From 20 April 1940 to 30 June she was part of the U-Bootschulflottille. In July 1940 she became part of the 21st U-boat Flotilla as a training boat until 16 March 1945 when she became part of the 31st U-boat Flotilla (training) until 5 May 1945 when she was scuttled at Bremerhaven. The boat was raised in 1950 and broken up for scrap.

Many sources incorrectly report that U-120 sank due to a malfunctioning toilet. This submarine was actually the much larger .

Notes

Footnotes

Citations

Bibliography

External links

German Type II submarines
U-boats commissioned in 1940
World War II submarines of Germany
1940 ships
Ships built in Lübeck
Operation Regenbogen (U-boat)
Maritime incidents in May 1945